WRTM-FM 100.5 FM is a radio station licensed to Sharon, Mississippi.  The station broadcasts an Urban Adult Contemporary format and is owned by Commander Communications Corporation.  Its transmitter is in Madison, Mississippi.

References

External links
WRTM-FM's official website

Urban adult contemporary radio stations in the United States
RTM-FM
Radio stations established in 2000
2000 establishments in Mississippi